Svalöv is a locality and the seat of Svalöv Municipality, Skåne County, Sweden with 3,633 inhabitants in 2010.

Sports
The following sports clubs are located in Svalöv:

 Svalövs BK
 Seiki Kai

References 

Municipal seats of Skåne County
Swedish municipal seats
Populated places in Skåne County
Populated places in Svalöv Municipality